Tean may refer to:

In Staffordshire, England
 Tean, Staffordshire, comprising the villages of Lower Tean and Upper Tean
 Tean railway station, a disused station
 The River Tean
 Tean Road Sports Ground, a cricket ground in Cheadle

Other
 Teän, one of the Isles of Scilly off the south-west coast of England
 Tean Kam, a khum in Cambodia